The Pamir languages are an areal group of the Eastern Iranian languages, spoken by numerous people in the Pamir Mountains, primarily along the Panj River and its tributaries.

In the 19th and early 20th centuries, the Pamir language family was sometimes referred to as the Ghalchah languages by western scholars. The term Ghalchah is no longer used to refer to the Pamir languages or the native speakers of these languages.

One of the most prolific researchers of the Pamir languages was Soviet linguist Ivan Ivanovich Zarubin.

Geographic distribution 

The Pamirian languages are spoken primarily in the Badakhshan Province of northeastern Afghanistan and the Gorno-Badakhshan Autonomous Region of eastern Tajikistan.

Pamirian languages are also spoken in Xinjiang and the Pamir language Sarikoli is spoken beyond the Sarikol Range on the Afghanistan-China border and thus qualifies as the easternmost of the extant Iranian languages.

Wakhi communities are also found in the adjacent Chitral District, Khyber Pakhtunkhwa and in Gojal, Gilgit Baltistan in Pakistan.

The only other living member of the Southeastern Iranian group is Pashto.

Classification 
No features uniting the Pamir languages as a single subgroup of Iranian have been demonstrated. The Ethnologue lists the Pamir languages along with Pashto as Southeastern Iranian, however, according to Encyclopedia Iranica, the Pamirian languages and Pashto belong to the North-Eastern Iranian branch.

Members of the Pamirian language area include four reliable groups: a Shughni-Yazgulyam group including Shughni, Sarikoli, and Yazgulyam; Munji and Yidgha; Ishkashimi and related dialects; and Wakhi. They have the subject-object-verb syntactic typology.

Václav Blažek (2019) suggests that the Pamir languages have a Burushaski-like substratum. Although Burushaski is today spoken in Pakistan to the south of the Pamir language area, Burushaski formerly had a much wider geographic distribution before being assimilated by Indo-Iranian languages.

Subgroups

Shughni-Yazgulami branch

The Shughni, Sarikoli, and Yazgulyam languages belong to the Shughni-Yazgulami branch. There are about 75,000 speakers of languages in this family in Afghanistan and Tajikistan (including the dialects of Rushani, Bartangi, Oroshori, Khufi, and Shughni). In 1982, there were about 20,000 speakers of Sarikoli in the Sarikol Valley located in the Tashkurgan Tajik Autonomous County in Xinjiang Province, China. Shughni and Sarikoli are not mutually intelligible. In 1994, there were 4000 speakers of Yazgulyam along the Yazgulyam River in Tajikistan. Yazgulyam is not written.

The Vanji language was spoken in the Vanj river valley the Gorno-Badakhshan Autonomous Region in Tajikistan, and was related to Yazgulyam. In the 19th century, the region was forcibly annexed to the Bukharan Emirate and a violent assimilation campaign was undertaken. By the end of the 19th century the Vanji language had disappeared, displaced by Tajik Persian.

Most language speakers and others in Tajikistan refer to languages in this group as 'Pamirski" or 'Pamir'. (e.g. "I can speak Pamir, Ishkashem and Wakhi")

Munji-Yidgha branch

The Munji and Yidgha languages are closely related. There are about 6,000 speakers of Yidgha in Upper Lotkoh Valley, Chitral District, Pakistan, and in 1992 there were around 2,500 speakers of Munji in the Munjan and Mamalgha Valleys of Badakhshan Province, northeastern Afghanistan. Munji-Yidgha shares with Bactrian a development *ð > , absent from the other three Pamir groups.  The extinct Sarghulami language of Badakhshan is thought to be of the Munji-Yidgha branch.

Sanglechi-Ishkashimi

There are about 2,500 speakers of Sanglechi and Ishkashmi in Afghanistan and Tajikistan respectively, they are not written languages.

Wakhi

There are around 58,000 speakers of the Wakhi language in Afghanistan, Tajikistan, China, Pakistan, and Russia.

Status 
The vast majority of Pamir speakers in Tajikistan and Afghanistan also use Tajik (Persian) as a literary language, which is—unlike the languages of the Pamir group—a Southwestern Iranian tongue. The language group is endangered, with the total number of speakers roughly around 100,000 in 1990.

See also
Wakhan

Bibliography
Payne, John, "Pamir languages" in Compendium Linguarum Iranicarum, ed. Schmitt (1989), 417–444.

References

External links
Ethnolinguistic map of Tajikistan 
Ishkashimi story with English translation
Ishkashimi-English Vocabulary List, also featuring words from other Pamir languages added for comparison
English-Ishkashimi- Zebaki-Wakhi-Yazghulami Vocabulary
A Short List of Yazghulami Words
 Grierson G. A. Ishkashmi, Zebaki, and Yazghulami, an account of three Eranian dialects. (1920)  

 
Eastern Iranian languages
Endangered Iranian languages